Shelby's Iron Brigade, also known as the Missouri Iron Brigade, was a Confederate cavalry brigade, led by Brigadier General Joseph O. Shelby, in the Trans-Mississippi Theater of the American Civil War.

Brigade nickname
The Iron Brigade nickname was created by Joseph O. Shelby's former adjutant, John Newman Edwards, in his 1867 account, Shelby and His Men.

Brigade formed
Shelby's Iron Brigade was originally formed in 1863, under orders from Major General Thomas C. Hindman, following a successful recruiting expedition into Missouri by Joseph O. Shelby, Upton Hays and John T. Coffee, who each recruited a regiment of cavalry. These new regiments - Shelby's 5th, Hays's 11th and Coffee's 6th (redesignated as 12th), were brigaded under the command of Colonel Shelby.

Campaigns

Shelby's Iron Brigade based themselves in Arkansas and participated in four major raids into Missouri during the war, earning a reputation as the most formidable brigade in the theater.

Shelby was promoted to Brigadier General, following his successful raid of 1863. When Shelby later assumed division command, he was replaced by M. Jeff Thompson. The brigade remained in Shelby's Division in the Army of Missouri and fought in Maj. Gen. Sterling Price's Missouri Expedition in 1864—saving Price's army from destruction several times, including the retreat at the Battle of Marmiton River.

In the autumn of 1864, some 1,500 of Shelby’s Iron Brigade cavalry surrounded Sedalia, Missouri and overpowered local Union militia defenders. They began to loot and sack the town on October 15, 1864.  Once General Thompson arrived in Sedalia, he ordered his men to stop the destruction and moved them on, leaving Sedalia once again in Union hands.

Later, the Missouri Iron Brigade distinguished themselves at the 1864 battles of Little Blue River and Westport, and captured many towns from their Union garrisons, including Potosi, Boonville, Waverly, Stockton, Lexington, and California, Missouri.

Brigade disbanded and resettled in Mexico
Rather than surrender in 1865 with the collapse of the Confederacy, Shelby and his men rode south into Mexico in June, where they offered their services to Emperor Maximilian, who declined to accept the ex-Confederates into his armed forces. However, the emperor did grant them land for an American colony in Mexico, and many of Shelby's Iron Brigade settled on the free land.

Union Army Iron Brigades
There have been other brigades known by the same name. Use of the "Iron Brigade" name is not taken lightly in the U.S. Army, and the present-day units that have taken "Iron Brigade" as their nickname have proven themselves in battle as worthy to hold the name.

Another brigade, in the Army of the Potomac, had previously been the first Iron Brigade, in the Union Army and later as the "Iron Brigade of the East" or "First Iron Brigade", to avoid confusion. This unit was the 1st Brigade, 1st Division, I Corps, prior to Meredith's brigade getting that designation. It consisted of the 22nd New York, 24th New York, 30th New York, 14th Regiment (New York State Militia), and 2nd U.S. Sharpshooters.

Another brigade, in the Army of the Potomac, from three western states, was the later named and most, well known Iron Brigade, famously known as the "Iron Brigade of the West", that fought in the Battle of Gettysburg. This brigade, was composed of units, from Indiana, Wisconsin, and Michigan, which consisted of the 2nd, 6th, and 7th Wisconsin Volunteer Infantry Regiments, the 19th Indiana, Battery B of the 4th U.S. Light Artillery, and joined later, by the 24th Michigan.

Although this Iron Brigade of the East served in the same infantry division as the Iron Brigade of the West, press attention focused primarily on the latter. Most of the Eastern regiments were mustered out before the Battle of Gettysburg, where the remaining Eastern Iron Brigade Regiments and the Iron Brigade of the West arguably achieved their greatest fame. Recent scholarship identifies two other brigades referred to by their members or others as "The Iron Brigade":
3rd Brigade, 1st Division, III Corps (17th Maine, 3rd Michigan, 5th Michigan, 1st, 37th, and 101st New York)
Reno's Brigade from the North Carolina expedition (21st and 35th Massachusetts, 51st Pennsylvania, and 51st New York)

See also
List of Missouri Confederate Civil War units

References
 Buresh, Lumir F., October 25 and the Battle of Mine Creek, The Lowell Press, 1977.
 Edwards, John N., Shelby and His Men, Cincinnati: Miami Printing and Publishing Co., 1867.
 Mueller, D.L., M. Jeff Thompson: Missouri’s Swamp Fox of the Confederacy, University of Missouri Press, 2007. .
 Sellmeyer, Deryl P, Jo Shelby's Iron Brigade, Pelican Publishing, 2007

Notes